Millicent Library in Fairhaven, Massachusetts was donated to the town by the family of Millicent Gifford Rogers, the youngest daughter of Abbie Gifford and wealthy industrialist Henry Huttleston Rogers. Young Millicent had died of heart failure in 1890 when she was barely seventeen years old. The library was dedicated on January 30, 1893. It was designed by Charles Brigham in the Richardsonian Romanesque style.

History

Millicent Gifford Rogers
While her family  resided in New York City, where her father was a key man in the Standard Oil Trust, young Millicent Rogers and her sisters and brother had been happy vacation and weekend habitués of the little town of Fairhaven from birth. With their parents, both of whom were themselves Fairhaven natives—they had spent happy, care-free hours there among relatives and friends, in particular communion with both maternal and paternal grandparents.

Millie dearly loved to sketch and read. She is to have once said on a visit to Fairhaven "I wish we had a good library! When she died at such a young age, her grieving family sought an appropriate means of memorializing her short life. Because she had been an avid reader, especially of poetry, the Rogers decided that they would build and donate to the town of Fairhaven a library named for her and given in the names of her sisters and brother.

Library
In the same year she had died, land was acquired and plan were begun to erect in Fairhaven a unique and lavish tribute to the arts, the splendid yet functional Millicent Library. The cornerstone was laid in September, 1891 at a quiet morning ceremony with only the family and their clergyman, Rev. J.M. Leighton, in attendance. After prayer, Millie's little brother, Harry, set the cornerstone. Within its confines were a sketch of Millicent, a tracing of the Rogers' ancestry, and a copy of the Fairhaven Star carrying a picture of the proposed building.

The Millicent Library describes the memorial window to the little girl who wished for a good library in Fairhaven as follows:

"In the Library, just to the left of the main entrance, is a stunning stained-glass window made by Clayton and Bell of London. In the central panel is the figure of Erato, the Muse of Poetry, and her features bear a striking resemblance to those of the girl to whose memory the library was erected."

Mark Twain extolled the library as "ideal".

See also
National Register of Historic Places listings in Bristol County, Massachusetts

References

External links

Millicent Library, Fairhaven, Massachusetts

Public libraries in Massachusetts
Fairhaven, Massachusetts
Libraries in Bristol County, Massachusetts
Library buildings completed in 1893
Libraries on the National Register of Historic Places in Massachusetts
Richardsonian Romanesque architecture in Massachusetts
National Register of Historic Places in Bristol County, Massachusetts